Zegara is a genus of moths within the family Castniidae. It was described by Oiticica in 1955.

Species
 Zegara personata (Walker, [1865])
 Zegara zagraea (Felder, 1874)

References

Castniidae